Bambra is a surname that is believed to derive from Bamber Bridge in Lancashire, England. Notable people with the surname include:

Jim Bambra (born 1956), British designer
Manpreet Bambra (born 1992), English actress

References 

English-language surnames
English toponymic surnames